Christians in Morocco constitute less than 1% of the country's population of 33,600,000 (2014 census). Most of the Christian adherents are Catholic and Protestants. 

The U.S. State Department estimates the number of Moroccan Christians as more than 40,000. Pew-Templeton estimates the number of Moroccan Christians at 20,000. The number of the Moroccans who converted to Christianity (most of them secret worshippers) are estimated between 8,000–50,000. Since 1960 a growing number of Moroccan Muslims are converting to Christianity.

Criminal prohibitions
Article 3 of the Moroccan constitution "guarantees to all the free exercise of beliefs". However, the Moroccan criminal code prohibits conversions to other religions than Islam. Conversions of Muslims to Christianity (either proselytization or apostasy) often occurred during the colonial period, when laws against such conversions did not exist.

According to Article 220 of the Moroccan Penal Code, "anyone who employs incitements to shake the faith of a Muslim or to convert him to another religion" incurs a sentence of three to six months' imprisonment and a fine of 200 to 500 dirhams. Any attempt to induce a Muslim to convert is illegal. Foreign missionaries either limit their proselytizing to non-Muslims or attempt to conduct their work discreetly. In spite of these limitations, a 2015 study estimates some 3,000 believers in Christ from a Muslim background.

History

Christianity in Morocco appeared during the Roman times, when it was practiced by Christian Berbers in Roman Mauretania Tingitana, although it disappeared after the Islamic conquests.

Early Christianity 
According to tradition, the martyrdom of St. Marcellus took place on 28 July 298 at Tingis (Tangier). Since the Tetrarchy (Emperor Diocletian's reform of governmental structures in 296), Mauretania Tingitana became part of the Diocese of Hispaniae (a Latin plural) and hence in the Praetorian Prefecture of the Gauls (Mauretania Caesariensis was in the diocese of Africa, in the other pretorian prefecture within the western empire), and remained so until its conquest by the Vandals. Lucilius Constantius is recorded as governor (praeses) in the mid to late fourth century.

Christianity was introduced to the region in the 2nd century AD, and gained converts in the towns and among slaves as well as among Berber farmers. By the end of the 4th century, the Romanized areas had been Christianized, and inroads had been made among the Berber tribes, who sometimes converted en masse. Schismatic and heretical movements also developed, usually as forms of political protest. The area had a substantial Jewish population as well.

Donatism was a Christian sect leading to a schism in the Church, in the region of the Church of Carthage, from the fourth to the sixth centuries.  Donatists argued that Christian clergy must be faultless for their ministry to be effective and their prayers and sacraments to be valid. Donatism had its roots in the long-established Christian community of the Roman Africa province (present-day Tunisia, Morocco, the northeast of Algeria, and the western coast of Libya) in the persecutions of Christians under Diocletian. Named after the Berber Christian bishop Donatus Magnus, Donatism flourished during the fourth and fifth centuries.

Muslim conquest 

Archaeological and scholarly research has shown that Christianity existed after the Muslim conquests. The Catholic church  gradually declined along with local Latin dialect. Another view however that exists is that Christianity in North Africa effectively ended soon after the conquest of North Africa by the Islamic Umayyad Caliphate between AD 647–709.

Many causes have been seen as leading to the decline of Christianity in Maghreb. One of them is the constant wars and conquests as well as persecutions. In addition, many Christians also migrated to Europe. The Church at that time lacked the backbone of a monastic tradition and was still suffering from the aftermath of heresies including the so-called Donatist heresy, and this contributed to the early obliteration of the Church in the present day Maghreb. Some historians contrast this with the strong monastic tradition in Coptic Egypt, which is credited as a factor that allowed the Coptic Church to remain the majority faith in that country until around after the 14th century despite numerous persecutions. In addition, the Romans were unable to completely assimilate the indigenous people like the Berbers.

The treatment and persecution of Christians under Almohad rule was a drastic change as well. Many Christians were killed, forced to convert, or forced to flee. Some Christians fled to the Christian kingdoms in the Iberian Peninsula and helped fuel the Reconquista.

Local Catholicism came under pressure when the Muslim fundamentalist regimes of the Almoravids and especially the Almohads came into power, and the record shows persecutions and demands made that the local Christians of Maghreb were forced to convert to Islam. A letter from the 14th century shows that there were still four bishoprics left in North Africa, admittedly a sharp decline from the over four hundred bishoprics in existence at the time of the Arab conquest. The Almohad Abd al-Mu'min forced the Christians and Jews of Tunis and Maghrib to convert in 1159. Berber Christians continued to live in the Maghrib until the early 15th century, and "[i]n the first quarter of the fifteenth century, we even read that the native Christians of Tunis, though much assimilated, extended their church, perhaps because the last of the persecuted Christians from all over the Maghreb had gathered there." Another group of Christians who came to North Africa after being deported from Islamic Spain were called the Mozarabic. They were recognised as forming the Moroccan Church by Pope Innocent IV.

Another phase of Christianity in Maghreb began with the arrival of the Portuguese in the 15th century. After the end of Reconquista, the Christian Portuguese and Spanish captured many ports in North Africa.

In June 1225, Honorius III issued the bull Vineae Domini custodes, which permitted two friars of the Dominican Order, named Dominic and Martin, to establish a mission in Morocco and look after the affairs of Christians there. The Bishop of Morocco, Lope Fernandez de Ain, was made the head of the Church of Africa, the only church officially allowed to preach in the continent, on 19 December 1246 by Pope Innocent IV. Innocent IV asked the emirs of Tunis, Ceuta and Bugia to permit Lope and Franciscian friars to look after the Christians in those regions. He thanked Caliph al-Sa'id for granting protection to the Christians and requested to allow them to create fortresses along the shores, but the Caliph rejected that request.

The bishopric of Marrakesh continued to exist until the late 16th century and was borne by the suffragans of Seville. Juan de Prado had attempted to re-establish the mission but was killed in 1631. Franciscan monasteries continued to exist in the city until the 18th century.

European influence (c. 1830 – 1956) 

During the era of the Spanish protectorate and the French protectorate over Morocco, the conditions of the Catholic Church have flourished, and Catholic churches, schools, and hospitals were built throughout the country, and until 1961, Sunday mass festivities were broadcast on radio and television networks.

Prior to independence, Morocco was home to half a million European Christian settlers.  During the French protectorate in Morocco, European Christians formed almost half the population of the city of Casablanca. Prior to independence, the numbers of the Catholics in French Morocco reached about 360,000 or about 4.1% of the population, Catholics in French Morocco were mostly of French descent, and to a lesser extent of Spanish and Italian ancestry. Some Moroccans of Berber or Arab descent converted to Christianity during the French colonialism. Since independence in 1956, the European population has decreased substantially, and many Catholics left to France or Spain. 

Between the last years of the 19th century and the beginning of the 20th century, an estimated 250,000 Spaniard Catholics lived in Morocco. Most Spaniards left Morocco after independence and their numbers were reduced to about 13,000. In the years leading up to the First World War, European Christians formed almost a quarter the population of Tangier. In 1950, Catholics in Spanish protectorate in Morocco and Tangier constitute 14.5% of the population, and the Spanish Morocco was home to 113,000 Catholic settlers. Catholics in Spanish protectorate in Morocco and Tangier were mostly of Spanish descent, and to a lesser extent of Portuguese, French and Italian ancestry.

Independent Morocco (since 1956) 

Today the expatriate Christian community (Roman Catholic and Protestant) consists of 40,000 practicing members, although estimates of Christians residing in the country at any particular time range up to 40,000. Approximately 3,000 foreign residents belong to the Russian and Greek Orthodox churches. Most Christians reside in the Casablanca, Tangier, Marrakesh, and Rabat urban areas. The majority of Christians in Morocco are foreigners, although Voice of the Martyrs reports there is a growing number of native Moroccans (45,000) converting to Christianity, especially in the rural areas. Many of the converts are baptized secretly in Morocco's churches. According to 2021 Report on International Religious Freedom; the number of Moroccan Christian citizens reached approximately 31,500, while the Moroccan Association for Human Rights estimates there are approximately 25,000 Moroccan Christian citizens.

Since 1960 a growing number of Moroccan Muslims are converting to Christianity. Many Moroccan Christians of Berber or Arab descent mostly converted during the modern era or under and after French colonialism.

Denominations

Roman Catholicism

There are around 30,000 Catholics in Morocco. Most of them are European expatriates, principally French and Spanish due to the country's historic ties to France and Spain. Another group is composed of Sub-Saharan immigrants, mainly students. The country is divided into two archdioceses; Rabat and Tangier.

Anglicanism 
 
While most areas of Africa (including eastern North Africa) have independent Anglican dioceses and provinces, the western part of North Africa, including the Anglican Church of Morocco, is part of the Diocese of Europe, which is itself part of the Province of Canterbury in the Church of England. There are two permanent chaplaincies, one in Casablanca and one in Tangier. Small groups of Anglicans have worshipped together in Marrakech, but there is no Anglican Church established here.

The Anglican Church of Saint Andrew, Tangier has become a tourist attraction, partly due to certain well-known figures buried in its churchyard. The church is an early twentieth-century replacement for an earlier smaller building, which was built with the express permission of the King of Morocco, on land donated by him.

The Anglican Church of St John the Evangelist, Casablanca, is centrally located, near to the Hyatt Regency, a landmark hotel in the city centre. It has a well-established congregation, and holds two services every Sunday morning to accommodate all worshippers. There is a catechetical programme for children.

Protestantism 

On 27 March 2010, the Moroccan magazine TelQuel stated that thousands of Moroccans had converted to Christianity. Pointing out the absence of official data, Service de presse Common Ground, cites unspecified sources that stated that about 5,000 Moroccans became Christians between 2005 and 2010. According to different estimates, there are about 25,000–45,000 Moroccan Christians converted from Islam. A still higher estimate credits a Christian program by Brother Rachid with involvement in the conversion of many Muslims in North Africa and the Middle East to Christianity, including 150,000 in Morocco.

Eastern Orthodoxy
 
There are three functioning Eastern Orthodox churches in Morocco: a Greek Orthodox Church in Casablanca and Russian Orthodox Churches in Rabat and Casablanca.

See also

Arab Christians
Berber Christians
Islam in Morocco
Bahá'í Faith in Morocco
History of the Jews in Morocco

References and notes

Further reading

External links
CIPC - Casablanca International Protestant Church
MMC – Marrakech Monday Church
RIC – Rabat International Church
 EEAM The Evangelical Church of Morocco
ECAM The Catholic Church in Morocco
AECAM Aumonerie des Etudiants Catholiques Au Maroc
Enseignement Catholique Au Maroc
 Hiwarmaroc a site of Moroccan converts to Christianity.
Muslims Turn to Christ in Morocco – CBN Report

 
Christianity in the Arab world
Berber Christians